Serpoleskea is a genus of mosses belonging to the family Amblystegiaceae.

Species:
 Serpoleskea confervoides (Brid.) Loeske
 Serpoleskea sprucei (Bruch) Loeske

References

Amblystegiaceae
Moss genera